Jing's Note is Singaporean Mandopop artist Wong JingLun's debut Mandarin solo studio album. It was released on 14 November 2008 by Warner Music Taiwan. A second edition was released on 12 December 2008, Jing's Note (Wish Your Love MV Limited Edition) (倫語錄 Wish Your Love 影音限定版) with a bonus DVD containing three music videos, and other behind-the-scene footage.

Track listing
 "每日一句" (Every day a Sentence)
 "月光" (Moonlight)
 "缺席" (Absent)
 "明天再說" (Talk about it Tomorrow)
 "慢半拍" (Half-Beat Slower)
 "我的天" (Oh My God)
 "懶" (Lazy)
 "走音" (Off-Key)
 "白日夢" (Daydream)
 "傻裡傻氣" (Silly)

Music videos
 "缺席" (Absent) MV
 "月光" (Moonlight) MV - feat Chie Tanaka
 "慢半拍" (Half-Beat Slower) MV - feat Xiao Xun of Hey Girl

References

2008 debut albums
Wong JingLun albums
Warner Music Taiwan albums